Scott Anthony Fujita (born April 28, 1979) is a former American football linebacker in the National Football League (NFL), and current Head of School at All Saints' Day School. He was drafted by the Kansas City Chiefs in the fifth round of the 2002 NFL Draft. He played 11 seasons for the Chiefs, Dallas Cowboys, New Orleans Saints and Cleveland Browns. He was a member of the 2009 Saints team that won Super Bowl XLIV, defeating the Indianapolis Colts. He played college football at California.

Early years
Scott Fujita was adopted as an infant by Rodney Fujita, who is a third-generation Japanese-American, and his wife Helen, who is white. Rodney was born at the Gila River War Relocation Center in Phoenix, Arizona where his father Nagao, a 442nd Infantry Regiment combat veteran who later became an attorney, was one of many Japanese-Americans whose family was interned during World War II. Fujita grew up in a traditional Japanese household, celebrating Japanese festivals and holidays, and considers himself "half-Japanese at heart".

He attended Rio Mesa High School in Oxnard, California.  In football, he was a two-way player at safety and tight end. As a senior, he tallied 188 tackles, 4 sacks, 5 interceptions, 15 receptions for 350 yards and 6 touchdowns.

In basketball, he averaged 15 points and 10 rebounds per game as a senior. He received first-team Channel League and Ventura County honors in both sports as a senior. He also competed in the long jump, triple jump and high jump.

College career
Fujita walked on at the University of California, Berkeley. As a redshirt freshman, he was converted from a safety into an outside linebacker. He played mostly on special teams, while collecting 8 defensive tackles as a backup.

As a sophomore, he made his first 2 starts. He had 15 tackles at the end of the season, but needed to have offseason neck surgery in the spring of 2000. As a junior, he started 11 games, making 41 tackles (13 for loss) and 4 sacks.

As a senior, he started 11 games at weakside linebacker, posting 60 tackles, 2.5 sacks and 2 forced fumbles. He finished his college career after appearing in 39 games with 24 starts, while registering 124 tackles, 7 sacks, 2 forced fumbles and one fumble recovery.

Professional career

Kansas City Chiefs
Fujita was selected by the Kansas City Chiefs in the fifth round (143rd) of the 2002 NFL Draft. As a rookie, he started 9 of 16 games, recording 63 tackles, 6 passes defensed, one sack and 15 special teams tackles (tied for second on the team). He made 9 tackles against the Buffalo Bills. He had 8 tackles and 2 passes defensed against the Seattle Seahawks.

In 2003, he started all 16 games and led the team with 151 tackles (fifth most in club history), while also registering 4 sacks, 6 passes defensed, one forced fumble and one interception. He had 15 tackles against the Houston Texans.

In 2004, he posted 112 tackles, 4.5 sacks and 3 passes defensed. His devastating hit against LaDainian Tomlinson, is remembered as a turning point in the game, when Fujita also recovered the ball before it went out of bounds.

In 2005, after the Chiefs selected linebacker Derrick Johnson with its first-round pick and also signed linebacker Kendrell Bell, Fujita asked to be traded. On September 3, he was sent to the Dallas Cowboys in exchange for a 2006 sixth round selection (#186-Tre' Stallings) and a 2007 conditional selection (not exercised). In three seasons, he registered 326 tackles and 9 1/2 sacks.

Dallas Cowboys
In the 2005 season, he played in 16 games and became the strongside linebacker starter for the last 8 contests, after Al Singleton was placed on the injured reserve list. He recorded 58 tackles, 2 sacks, one pass defensed, 2 forced fumbles and 9 special teams tackles. He was declared a free agent at the end of the season.

New Orleans Saints
On March 13, 2006, he signed with the New Orleans Saints, reuniting with former Dallas Cowboys offensive coordinator, now head coach Sean Payton. He was the first free agent to join the Saints when they returned to New Orleans after their year-long absence in the aftermath of Hurricane Katrina.

Fujita was named defensive captain of the 2007 Saints. In Week 1 of the 2008 season, Fujita caught a crucial game-winning interception in the very end against the Tampa Bay Buccaneers. In the 2009 season, he earned a Super Bowl ring as a member of the Saints team that won Super Bowl XLIV on February 7, 2010, defeating the Indianapolis Colts 31-17 to win the team's first league championship.

Cleveland Browns
Fujita was a free agent after the 2009 season, and on March 7, 2010, he signed a contract worth $14 million over three years, including $8 million in guaranteed money with the Cleveland Browns, who coveted his leadership qualities.  In September, he was elected one of the Browns' defensive captains for the 2010 season.  Through nine games, Fujita was second on the team in tackles and sacks, but he was injured in a November 14 game against the New York Jets and was expected to be out of action for an extended period. On November 29, 2011, he was placed in the injured reserve list with a fractured hand he suffered in the eleventh game against the Cincinnati Bengals.

Fujita was suspended by the NFL for the first 3 games of the 2012 season because of his alleged participation in the Saints' bounty scandal. On September 7, his suspension was lifted. On October 9, 2012, four weeks and three days after an internal appeals panel vacated suspensions imposed on Fujita, Saints linebacker Jonathan Vilma, Saints defensive end Will Smith, and free-agent defensive end Anthony Hargrove, the league re-issued the discipline, with reductions to the suspensions of Fujita and Hargrove. Vilma's suspension remained a full season, and Smith's remained four games.  Fujita's suspension was reduced from three games to one, and Hargrove's reduced from eight games to seven. After the Week 6 game against the New York Giants, Fujita was placed on injured reserve with a potentital career-ending neck injury on October 24. He finished with 14 tackles and one sack in four games.

On December 11, 2012, it was announced in the media that former commissioner Paul Tagliabue exonerated Fujita of all culpability and wrongdoing in the Saints pay-for-play scandal, vacating his suspension and clearing his record. On April 22, 2013, he announced his retirement.

NFL statistics

Retirement from football
On April 22, 2013, Fujita signed a one-day contract with the New Orleans Saints while in Machu Picchu with his former teammate Steve Gleason, announcing his retirement immediately after.  In August 2013, Fujita joined the new Fox Sports 1 sports network as an analyst on its Fox Football Daily program.

Career as educator

In 2018 Fujita became the Athletic Director of All Saints' Day School, in Carmel, California, where he had been a parent for years. On January 30, 2019, the school announced Fujita as its Head of School.

Fujita holds a Bachelor of Arts in Political Science with a minor in Business Administration, and a Master of Arts in Education from the University of California, Berkeley, where he graduated with honors.

Personal life
Fujita is married with three children; he and his family have a home in Carmel Valley, California.  He is politically liberal, and has gone on record as a supporter of women's rights and gay rights as well as an advocate for adoption, wetlands preservation, and other causes; he was named the Saints "Man of the Year" in 2009 for his charitable activities.

References

External links
 
 California Golden Bears bio

1979 births
Living people
Sportspeople from Oxnard, California
Players of American football from California
Players of American football from Florida
American adoptees
American football linebackers
California Golden Bears football players
Kansas City Chiefs players
Dallas Cowboys players
New Orleans Saints players
Cleveland Browns players
People from Ventura, California
People from Carmel Valley, California
Sportspeople from Ventura County, California